The Timpanogos were a tribe of Native Americans populating central Utah in the 1800s.

Timpanogos may also refer to:

Mount Timpanogos, a mountain in Utah in the United States
Timpanogos Cave National Monument, a cave system near Mount Timpanogos.
Timpanogos High School in Orem, Utah.
Lake Timpanogos, original name for Utah Lake, and the mythical river once believed to flow from there to the Pacific Ocean.